Sinilabeo is a genus of cyprinid freshwater fish found in China and Vietnam.

Species
According to FishBase, there are currently six recognized species in this genus. Only two of these (marked with a star* in list) are recognized in this genus by Catalog of Fishes, which places S. binhluensis in Altigena, while the remaining are considered junior synonyms of various Bangana species.

 Sinilabeo binhluensis V. H. Nguyễn, 2001
 Sinilabeo brevirostris V. H. Nguyễn, 2001
 Sinilabeo cirrhinoides H. W. Wu & R. D. Lin, 1977
 Sinilabeo hummeli* E. Zhang, S. O. Kullander & Yi-Yu Chen, 2006
 Sinilabeo longibarbatus* J. X. Chen & J. Z. Zheng, 1988
 Sinilabeo longirostris V. H. Nguyễn, 2001

References

Cyprinidae genera
Cyprinid fish of Asia